Witmer v. United States, 348 U.S. 375 (1955), was a case in which the Supreme Court of the United States upheld a draft board's rejection of Jehovah's Witness claim of conscientious objector status as lacking sincerity.

See also
List of United States Supreme Court cases, volume 348

References

External links
 
 

Conscientious objection
1955 in United States case law
United States Supreme Court cases
Jehovah's Witnesses litigation in the United States
United States military case law
1955 in religion
United States Supreme Court cases of the Warren Court
Christianity and law in the 20th century